Edward Wortley Montagu (8 February 167822 January 1761) was an English coal-owner and politician. He was British Ambassador to the Ottoman Empire, husband of the writer Lady Mary Wortley Montagu and father of the writer and traveller Edward Wortley Montagu.

Life
Son of Sidney Wortley Montagu and grandson of Edward Montagu, 1st Earl of Sandwich, Wortley Montagu was educated at Westminster School and was admitted at  Trinity College, Cambridge in 1693. He entered the Middle Temple, also in 1693, and the Inner Temple in 1706. He was called to the bar in 1699.

In 1700–1701 Montagu was on a Grand Tour, some of the time accompanied by Joseph Addison. He visited France and Switzerland.

Montagu was a prominent Whig politician, and first elected as Member of Parliament for Huntingdon in 1705. In a close election in the two-member seat, with much bribery by the victors, he was returned with Sir John Cotton, ahead of John Pedley. He became a Lord Commissioner of the Treasury, serving from 1714 to 1715. The election in the two-member constituency was uncontested, and he was returned with the Tory Sir Thomas Crosse.

Made Ambassador to the Ottoman Empire and elected the representative of the Levant Company on the nomination of King George I on 10 May 1716, Montagu arrived with his wife at Adrianople (now known as Edirne) on 13 March 1717. He was charged with pursuing the ongoing negotiations between the Ottomans and the Habsburg Empire. Unsuccessful in his position, he was not accredited Ambassador to the Ottoman Porte in Constantinople before he was recalled in October 1717. He left Turkey on 15 July 1718 and travelled for some time in the East. 

Upon his return to England, Montagu fell out with the Whig hierarchy. He remained a Member of Parliament, for Huntingdon once more from 1722 to 1734. 

In 1726 Montagu was a signatory, with his father, to the document creating the Grand Allies coal cartel in North East England. Coal-related business had been a preoccupation for him since about 1709: he was included in meetings from about that time of an earlier coal cartel to which his father belonged. He succeeded his father in 1727, inheriting Wortley Hall, near Barnsley in South Yorkshire. He represented Peterborough in parliament from 1734 until his death in 1761.

Wortley Hall

Montagu remodelled Wortley Hall, where in 1743 a design by Giacomo Leoni for the south front was carried out. From 1757 to 1761 the East Wing was added. The work was carried out by John Platt. Howard Colvin states that the design was probably by Matthew Brettingham. Work by Platt continued after Montagu's death, with the West Wing added for his daughter Mary in the 1780s.

Family
Montagu is known for his correspondence with, seduction of, and elopement with Mary Pierrepont, daughter of Evelyn Pierrepont, 1st Duke of Kingston-upon-Hull. They married in 1712. On his death, he left the hall and a large fortune to his daughter Mary, having in 1755 cut off his son Edward with only a small allowance. Mary married the future Prime Minister, John Stuart, 3rd Earl of Bute.

References
 The Life of Lady Mary Wortley Montagu – Robert Halsband – Clarendon Press – 1956

Notes

1678 births
1761 deaths
Ambassadors of Great Britain to the Ottoman Empire
British MPs 1707–1708
British MPs 1708–1710
British MPs 1710–1713
British MPs 1715–1722
British MPs 1722–1727
British MPs 1727–1734
British MPs 1734–1741
British MPs 1741–1747
British MPs 1747–1754
British MPs 1754–1761
Members of the Parliament of Great Britain for English constituencies
English MPs 1705–1707
Whig (British political party) MPs
Edward